Thank Your Lucky Stars is the sixth studio album by American dream pop duo Beach House. It was co-produced by the band and Chris Coady, and was released on October 16, 2015, by Sub Pop in North America, Bella Union in Europe, and Mistletone Records in Australia. The album was released less than two months after their fifth studio album, Depression Cherry.

Described by the band as "not a companion to Depression Cherry, or a surprise, or b-sides", Thank Your Lucky Stars was unexpectedly announced nine days before its release via the band's Twitter account. It received mostly positive reviews from critics.

Background and recording
The album was recorded at Studio in the Country in Bogalusa, Louisiana, and mixed at Sonic Ranch in Tornillo, Texas. Although the album was recorded simultaneously alongside Depression Cherry, the band felt that the records should be seen as distinct unconnected works. Despite this, the words "Thank Your Lucky Stars" were etched in the runout of the vinyl pressings of Depression Cherry. The cover art is a photograph of Victoria Legrand's mother taken in the late 1950s.

Reception

Thank Your Lucky Stars was released to highly positive reviews. At Metacritic, which assigns a normalized rating out of 100 to reviews from mainstream critics, the album has an average score of 80, based on 18 reviews.

Jayson Greene of Pitchfork suggested the songs took on a "darker edge" than those from Depression Cherry, judging the songs to feel smaller by having stripped away the typical cathedral-like reverb from the group's previous albums. Greene likened the mood of the songs to Beach House's material before they joined Sub Pop, describing the feeling as "pneumatic, dusty, like they are pulling a blanket around themselves in a heatless attic to ward off a threatening chill." Although the "joy and comfort have vanished" from the material, Greene claimed that that album is "still undeniably a Beach House album, a familiar mix of warm tones and chilly sentiments." Ultimately, Greene welcomed the addition to the band's repertoire, but suggested that a new album so soon created a dissonance that feels like "too much of a good thing."

In a review from The A.V. Club, Corbin Reiff described the album as "most assuredly a continuation of many of the same motifs and hallmarks of the group's last release." Reiff hailed the band's craft, arguing that "Beach House has mastered the art of space by this point and seems to have an instinct for how long to drag out a keyboard melody or a guitar line before bringing in another element to keep things from bogging down." Although he felt Depression Cherry and Thank Your Lucky Stars were similar in motif, Reiff praised the band's decision to separate the songs, rather than tack them onto the former. For Reiff, Thank Your Lucky Stars supports itself as a singular entity where "the full sonic and emotional weight is tremendous."

Writing for Rolling Stone, Meagan Fredette gave praise to Victoria Legrand's vocals stating that "her singing on Thank Your Lucky Stars feels more playful than usual, a welcome lightness that comes across from the first moments of "Majorette," the album's opener." "Elegy to the Void" was also singled out as a highlight of the record with Fredette describing the track as "the album’s crown jewel" and "as good a summation as any of what Beach House does best." Emphasising the maturity of the record in comparison to the band's debut, she suggests that "Like all their albums, this one is full of songs made for dreaming of a bygone love, or humming quietly to a new one."

Commercial performance 
In the United States, Thank Your Lucky Stars debuted at number four on the Top Rock Albums chart, with 10,000 copies sold in its first week. It was the band's second release of 2015, following Depression Cherry, which debuted at number one on the Top Rock Albums chart after its release on August 28.

Accolades

Track listing 
All lyrics written by Victoria Legrand; all music composed and arranged by Beach House.

Personnel
Beach House
 Alex Scally – keyboards , guitar and bass 
 Victoria Legrand – keyboards , bass guitar , guitar 

Additional musicians
 Graham Hill – live drums and percussion 
 Chris Bear – percussion 

Production
 Beach House – production, mixing
 Chris Coady – production
 David Tolomei – engineering
 Jay Wesley – assistant engineering
 Shane Wesley – "all around dude"
 Manuel Calderon – mixing, engineering
 Heba Kadry – mastering

Artwork
 Victoria Legrand – photography, lettering
 Alexandra B. McLean – cover photo
 Post Typography – design

Charts

Release history

References

External links
 

2015 albums
Beach House albums
Sub Pop albums
Albums produced by Chris Coady
Albums recorded at Studio in the Country